Eduard Hildebrandt (9 September 1818 in Danzig25 October 1868 in Berlin) was a German landscape painter.

Biography
He served as apprentice to his father, a house-painter at Danzig. He was not twenty when he moved to Berlin, where he was taken in hand by Wilhelm Krause, a painter of sea pieces. Several early pieces exhibited after his death—a breakwater, dated 1838, ships in a breeze off Swinemünde (1840), and other canvases of this and the following year—show Hildebrandt to have been a careful student of nature, with inborn talents kept down by the conventionalisms of the formal school to which Krause belonged.

Accident made him acquainted with masterpieces of French art displayed at the Berlin Academy, and these awakened his curiosity and envy. He went to Paris, where, about 1842, he entered the atelier of Isabey and became the companion of Lepoittevin. In a short time he sent home pictures which might have been taken for copies from these artists. Gradually he mastered the mysteries of touch and the secrets of effect in which the French at this period excelled.

He also acquired the necessary skill in painting figures, and returned to Germany, skilled in the rendering of many kinds of landscape forms. His pictures of French street life, done about 1843, while impressed with the stamp of the Paris school, reveal a spirit eager for novelty, quick at grasping, equally quick at rendering, momentary changes of tone and atmosphere.

After 1843 Hildebrandt, under the influence of Humboldt, extended his travels, and in 1864-1865 he went round the world. Whilst his experience became enlarged his powers of concentration broke down. He lost the taste for detail in seeking for scenic breadth, and a fatal facility of hand diminished the value of his works for all those who look for composition and harmony of hue as necessary concomitants of tone and touch.

In oil he gradually produced less, in water colours more, than at first, and his fame must rest on the sketches which he made in the latter form, many of them represented by chromolithography. Fantasies in red, yellow and opal, sunset, sunrise and moonshine, distances of hundreds of miles like those of the Andes and the Himalaya, narrow streets in the bazaars of Cairo or Suez, panoramas as seen from mast-heads, wide cities like Bombay or Pekin, narrow strips of desert with measure-less expanses of skyall alike display his quality of bravura. Hildebrandt died at Berlin on 25 October 1868.

References

External links 

1818 births
1868 deaths
Artists from Gdańsk
19th-century German painters
German male painters
19th-century German male artists